Vaie is a comune (municipality) in the Metropolitan City of Turin in the Italian region Piedmont, located about  west of Turin in the Susa Valley.

Vaie borders the following municipalities: Condove, Sant'Antonino di Susa, Chiusa di San Michele, Coazze and Valgioie.

Demographic evolution

References

Cities and towns in Piedmont